List of Serbian Royal Residences:

 Stari Dvor
 Novi Dvor
 Royal Compound
 Kraljevski Dvor
 Beli dvor
 Konak Kneginje Ljubice
 Konak Kneza Miloša
 Obrenović Villa, Smederevo
 King Peter I Villa in Senjak, Belgrade
 Prince Mihailo Konak, Kragujevac

Former residences 
 Stari Konak (demolished)
 Mali Dvorac (demolished)
 Maršalat Dvora (demolished)
 Kruševac Fortress (seat of the medieval Serb rulers; now ruined)

See also 
House of Karađorđević
House of Obrenović
Lists of royal residences

References 

Palaces in Serbia
Royal residences in Serbia
Buildings and structures in Belgrade
Royal residences
Serbian
Serbia